Adrian Frederick George Wyatt, FRS is a British physicist, and Emeritus Professor at University of Exeter.
He is a member of the Quantum Systems and Nanomaterials group.
He won the 2004 Fernand Holweck Medal and Prize of the Institute of Physics.

Works
Lifetimes of Fast R+ rotons due to Scattering by Thermal Phonons in Superfluid 4He. M.A.H. Tucker and A.F.G. Wyatt J Low Temp Physics 110 (1998) 425-430

A Fast Pulsed Source of Ballistic R- rotons in Superfluid 4He,M.A.H. Tucker and A.F.G. Wyatt, J Low Temp Physics 110 (1998) 455-460

The Contact Angle of Liquid 4He on Cs: evidence for ripplons at the He-Cs interface.J. Klier and A.F.G. Wyatt,J Low Temp Physics 110 (1998) 919-943

Evidence for Bose Einstein Condensate in Liquid 4He from Quantum Evaporation. A.F.G. Wyatt Nature 391 (1998) 56-59

The Thin Film State of 4He on Cs and Rb.  J. Klier and Adrian F.G. Wyatt, J Low Temp Physics 113 (1998) 817-822

The Evaporation Probability of R- rotons relative to R+ rotons in Superfluid 4He. M.A.H. Tucker and A.F.G. Wyatt, J Low Temp Physics 113 (1998) 615-620

The Spatial Evolution of High Frequency Phonons in Superfluid 4He from a Pulse-Heated Source. M.A.H. Tucker and A.F.G. Wyatt, J Low Temp Physics 113 (1998) 621-626

The Creation of High Energy Phonons from Low Energy Phonons in Liquid Helium. I.N. Adamenko, K.É. Nemchenko, A.V. Zhukov, M.A.H. Tucker and A.F.G. Wyatt Phys. Rev. Letts 82 (1999) 1482-5

Direct Evidence for R- Rotons Having Antiparallel Momentum and Velocity M.A.H. Tucker and A.F.G. Wyatt Science 283 (1999) 1150

The Nonwetting Behaviour of Dilute 3He/4He Mixtures on Cs. J. Klier and A.F.G. Wyatt J Low Temp Physics (1999) to be published

The creation of supra-thermal densities of high energy phonons in HeII A.F.G. Wyatt, M.A.H. Tucker, I.N. Adamenko, K.É. Nemchenko and A.V. Zhukov Physica B (1999) 

The Generation of High Energy Phonons from a Cold Phonon Pulse and their Lifetime in Superfluid 4He M.A.H. Tucker, A.F.G. Wyatt, I.N. Adamenko, K.É. Nemchenko and A.V. Zhukov In preparation (1999)

References

British physicists
Academics of the University of Exeter
Fellows of the Royal Society
Living people
Year of birth missing (living people)